The Buckingham House and Industrial School Complex is a historic trade school complex located near Buckeystown, Frederick County, Maryland. It consists of thirteen buildings associated with a trade school for boys from poor families that operated from 1898 to 1944. The complex centers on a 3-story dormitory building built for the school, but also includes the late 18th-century Federal style Buckingham House. The surrounding farm was, uniquely for the area, irrigated.  Bordering the Monocacy River, the grounds include several significant late Woodland period archeological sites.

After the school closed, the property was donated to the Episcopal Diocese of Maryland.  It became a youth camp and then a conference center named after the first bishop ordained in Maryland, the Rev. Claggett.

It was added to the National Register of Historic Places in 1982.

References

External links

, including 2006 photo, at Maryland Historical Trust

Houses in Frederick County, Maryland
Houses on the National Register of Historic Places in Maryland
Archaeological sites on the National Register of Historic Places in Maryland
Industrial history of Maryland
National Register of Historic Places in Frederick County, Maryland